The Dutch Open is an annual badminton tournament held in the Netherlands for the first time in November 1931 and is currently organized by Nederlandse Badminton Bond (NBB). It is a part of the European Badminton Circuit.

Past winners

Performances by nation

References

External links
Official website
1932–2002 Dutch Open Champions

 
Badminton tournaments in the Netherlands
1931 establishments in the Netherlands
Recurring sporting events established in 1932